Northland School is a small state primary school in Northland, western Wellington,  and was established in 1906. The school is situated at 14 Harbour View Road and is a decile ten school. Northland School caters for Years 1 through 8, and there are 4 teams, each made up of 2–3 year groups. Each team has 3–4 classes and the children change classes every year. The school has a Bring Your Own Device (or BYOD) system. In 2016 the school received funding to rebuild aging and leaky classrooms.

Sport 
Northland School compete in many Western Zone Championships. These include Football, Rippa Rugby, Cricket, Athletics and Swimming. The school also has a large focus on Netball and the school Netball team has its own website (linked below).

Notable alumni 

 Ocean Mercier - scientist
 Shona McCullagh - choreographer and dancer
 Tandi Wright - actor

2006 centennial

In 2006, Northland School held its 100 Year Anniversary. All of the students took part in the school play. The students were divided into four teams; Team 1 (Years 0–2) took the first 25 years, Team 2 (Years 3–4) took the next 25 years, Team 3 (Years 5–6) took the next 25 years, and Team 4 (Years 7–8) took the last 25 years.

School principals
The school has had the following principals:
2021 - present Andrea Peetz
2003–2020 Jeremy Edwards
1995–2002 Pat Manning
1990–1994 Liz Millar
1967–1990 Lou Grondin
1962–1966 Mr C. P. Bryce
1957–1961 Mr. L. H. Bansgrove 
1956–1957 Mr. R. MacCaskill
1954–1956 Mr. H. Downes
1951–1953 Mr. H. Blackburn
1946–1951 Mr. E. G. Thomas
1943–1946 Mr. C. F. Rockel
1942–1943 Mr. N. Gilchrist
1939–1941 Mr. H. F. Gabites
1937–1939 Mr. A. J. Trevena
1926–1937 Mr. J. Barnett
1923–1926 Mr. O. J. Howarth
1906–1923 Mr. D .M. Polson

References

External links
School website
School Netball team website
Education Review Office (ERO) reports for Northland School

Educational institutions established in 1906
Primary schools in New Zealand
Schools in Wellington City
1906 establishments in New Zealand